The 1940 World Series matched the Cincinnati Reds against the Detroit Tigers, with the Reds winning a closely contested seven-game series. Meanwhile, Bill Klem worked the last of his record 18 World Series as an umpire.

Other story lines marked this series. Henry Quillen Buffkin Newsom, the father of Detroit's star pitcher Bobo Newsom, died in a Cincinnati hotel room the day after watching him win Game 1. Newsom came back to hurl a shutout in Game 5 in his memory. Called on to start a third time after a single day of rest by Tiger manager Del Baker, he pitched well in Game 7 until the seventh inning, when the Reds scored two runs to take the lead and eventually the game and the Series.

The Reds' star pitchers Paul Derringer and Bucky Walters won two games apiece, with Derringer winning the decisive seventh game. Walters hurled two complete games, allowing only eight hits and three runs combined. He also hit a home run in Game 6 in the midst of his 4–0 shutout, which sent the Series to a Game 7.

It was redemption of sorts for the Reds, who returned to the World Series after being swept by the Yankees squad in 1939. The Reds' win in Game 2 against Detroit snapped a 10-game losing streak for the National League in the Series going back to Game 5 in 1937.

The victory culminated a somewhat turbulent season for the Reds, who played large stretches of the season without injured All-Star catcher Ernie Lombardi. And on August 3, Lombardi's backup, Willard Hershberger, committed suicide in Boston a day after a defensive lapse cost the Reds a game against the Bees. Hershberger was hitting .309 at the time of his death. The Reds dedicated the rest of the season to "Hershie." One of the stars in the World Series was 40-year-old Jimmie Wilson. Wilson had been one of the Reds' coaches before Hershberger's suicide forced him back onto the playing field as Lombardi's backup. With Lombardi hurting, Wilson did the bulk of the catching against Detroit and hit .353 for the Series and recorded the team's only stolen base.

Reds' manager Bill McKechnie became the first manager to win a World Series with two different teams, at the helm of the Pittsburgh Pirates in 1925, after trailing three games to one against Walter Johnson and the Washington Senators.

Summary

Matchups

Game 1

Bobo Newsom won Game 1 aided by a five-run second inning by Detroit. Two singles and an error loaded the bases before Pinky Higgins drove in two runs with a single. A walk reloaded the bases before Dick Bartell's two-run single. Bruce Campbell's RBI single knocked starter Paul Derringer out of the game. The Reds got on the board in the fourth when Ival Goodman hit a leadoff double and scored on Jimmy Ripple's single, but Campbell's two-run home run in the fifth off of Whitey Moore extended the Tigers' lead to 7–1. The Reds got another run in the eighth when Billy Werber doubled and scored on Goodman's single, but nothing else as Detroit took a 1–0 series lead.

The Tigers' win in Game 1 was the first World Series game won by a non-New York City team since 1935. In every World Series between 1935 and 1940, either both teams were from New York City or a New York City team won in a sweep (1938 and 1939).

Game 2

Detroit struck first in Game 2 Bucky Walters allowed two leadoff walks in the first, then an RBI single to Charlie Gehringer and ground-ball RBI double-play to Hank Greenberg, but the Reds tied it in the second on four singles off of Schoolboy Rowe, two of which by Eddie Joost and Billy Myers scoring a run each. Next inning, Jimmy Ripple's two-run home run put the Reds up 4–2. Back-to-back doubles by Walters and Billy Werber made it 5–2 Reds in the fourth. The Tigers got a run in the sixth on Hank Greenberg's RBI double after a walk and forceout in the sixth, but nothing else besides Pinky Higgins's leadoff double in the fifth as the Reds tied the series with a 5–3 win heading to Detroit.

Game 3

The Reds struck first in Game 3 when Billy Werber doubled to lead off the first off of Tommy Bridges and scored on Ival Goodman's single, but the Tigers tied it in the fourth on Hank Greenberg's double-play after back-to-back leadoff singles off of  Jim Turner. Detroit went up 5–1 in the seventh on two-run home runs by Rudy York and Pinky Higgins. The Reds got a run in the eighth on  Mike McCormick's RBI single with two on, but in the bottom half, Greenberg hit a leadoff triple off of Joe Beggs before  Bruce Campbell's RBI single and Higgins's RBI double made it 7–2 Tigers. In the ninth after a leadoff single and error, RBI singles by Eddie Joost and Werber made it 7–4 Tigers, but Bridges struck out McCormick to end the game as Detroit took a 2–1 series lead.

Game 4

In Game 4, after a leadoff walk off of Dizzy Trout, Ival Goodman's RBI double and Pinky Higgins's error on Jimmy Ripple's ground ball made it 2–0 Reds in the first. They made it 3–0 in the third on Jimmy Ripple's RBI double after two leadoff singles. The Tigers got on the board in the bottom half when Paul Derringer walked Barney McCosky, who moved to second on a groundout and scored on Hank Greenberg's RBI double, but the Reds got back that run in the fourth on Ival Goodman's sacrifice fly off of  Clay Smith after a leadoff walk and double. The Tigers got another run in the sixth  Bruce Campbell singled with two outs and scored on Higgins's triple, but the Reds again got the run back in the eighth when Billy Werber singled with two outs off of Archie McKain, moved to second on a wild pitch and scored on  Mike McCormick's RBI single. Derringer pitched a complete game to give the Reds a 5–2 win, tying the series 2–2.

Game 5

Bobo Newsom allowed only three singles and two walks in the shutout, the day after his father died. Detroit got on the board on Hank Greenberg's three-run home run after two leadoff singles in the third. Next inning,  Billy Sullivan drew a leadoff walk, moved to second on a sacrifice bunt and scored on Dick Bartell's double. Two walks by starter Junior Thompson and reliever Whitey Moore loaded the bases before Hank Greenberg's sacrifice fly and after another walk,  Bruce Campbell's two-run single made it 7–0 Tigers. They got another run in the eighth on Johnny Hutchings's wild pitch with two on and were just one win way from the championship heading back to Cincinnati.

Game 6

Bucky Walters drew the Reds even with a five-hit shutout. He helped his own cause with an RBI fielder's choice in the sixth with the bases loaded off of Johnny Gorsica and a solo home run in the eighth off of Fred Hutchinson. Schoolboy Rowe was knocked out after just  of an inning, allowing four hits, including RBI singles to Ival Goodman and Jimmy Ripple. The Reds' 4–0 win forced a final Game 7.

Game 7

Game 7 was over in 1 hour, 47 minutes. Detroit and pitcher Bobo Newsom clung to a 1-0 lead, courtesy of Charlie Gehringer's third inning RBI single off of Paul Derringer, until the seventh. Leadoff doubles by Frank McCormick and Jimmy Ripple tied the score, followed by a sacrifice bunt and Billy Myers' sacrifice fly for the game-winning (and Series-winning) run.

Composite line score
1940 World Series (4–3): Cincinnati Reds (NL) over Detroit Tigers (AL)

Home runs by pitchers
Bucky Walters, converted to pitching only after a torn cartilage (not repairable in those days) had slowed him down as a runner, was the fourth National League pitcher to hit a home run during a World Series game. The others were:

Notes

References

External links

 Cincinnati Reds History
  Detroit Tigers History

World Series
World Series
Cincinnati Reds postseason
Detroit Tigers postseason
World Series
World Series
1940s in Cincinnati
World Series
World Series
Baseball competitions in Detroit
Baseball competitions in Cincinnati